Coedmor National Nature Reserve is a nature reserve in Wales, located just south of Cardigan, between Llechryd Bridge and the Teifi Marshes in Ceredigion. It was established in order to protect the natural oak woodland on the slopes on either sides of the Teifi gorge.

With Cilgerran Castle standing dramatically above wooded slopes, the area has attracted painters such as Turner and Richard Wilson, amongst other travellers and writers.

The gently flowing River Teifi and its banks are a habitat for otters, and for the rare clubtailed dragonfly. Beside the dominant oaks, other broadleaved tree species include lime, ash, wych elm, holly, spindle and hazel. Nearly 200 species of lichens have been recorded as being present in the woodland and 31 species of butterflies have been recorded from the reserve or the area around it.

External links
 Countryside Council for Wales

National nature reserves in Wales
Nature reserves in Ceredigion